Erbessa graba is a moth of the family Notodontidae first described by Herbert Druce in 1899. It is found in Brazil, Peru, Colombia and Ecuador.

References

Moths described in 1899
Notodontidae of South America